Maasdijk is a hamlet  in the Dutch province of South Holland and is part of the municipality Hoeksche Waard. Maasdijk lies north west of Westmaas on the road to Reedijk.

Maasdijk is not a statistical entity, and considered part of Mijnsheerenland. It has place name signs, and consists of about 30 or 50 houses depending on the definition.

References

Populated places in South Holland
Hoeksche Waard